is a mountain in central Yakushima in Kagoshima Prefecture. 

The mountains are registered in UNESCO World Heritage Site as "Yakushima".

References

External links 
 

Mountains of Kagoshima Prefecture